Estadio de Béisbol Monclova is a stadium in Monclova, Mexico. It is primarily used for baseball and is the home field of the Monclova Steelers. It holds 8,500 people.

References 

1975 establishments in Mexico
Mexican League ballparks
Sports venues completed in 1975
Sports venues in Coahuila